Vasilijs Stepanovs (3 March, 28 May or 12 December 1927 – 8 April 2011) was a Soviet weightlifter. He was born in Russia as Vasily Matveyevich Stepanov, but later settled in Latvia, after serving with the Soviet Baltic Fleet there. 

Stepanovs took up weightlifting in 1948, and in 1953 won the Soviet middleweight title. He then moved to the light-heavyweight class and won the 1955 European and 1956 Soviet titles. He finished second at the 1955 World Championships and 1956 Olympics, both times behind Tommy Kono. After the Olympics he progressed to the middle-heavyweight division and set four ratified world records in the press between 1958 and 1962. In retirement he trained weightlifters in Riga, Latvia.

References 

1927 births
2011 deaths
Sportspeople from Saint Petersburg
Latvian male weightlifters
Soviet male weightlifters
Olympic weightlifters of the Soviet Union
Weightlifters at the 1956 Summer Olympics
Olympic silver medalists for the Soviet Union
Olympic medalists in weightlifting
Medalists at the 1956 Summer Olympics
European Weightlifting Championships medalists
World Weightlifting Championships medalists